Matsukawa may refer to:

Places
Matsukawa, Nagano (Kitaazumi), a village in Kitaazumi District, Nagano Prefecture, Japan
Matsukawa, Nagano (Shimoina), a town in Shimoina District, Nagano Prefecture
Matsukawa Dam, Nagano Prefecture

Railway stations
Matsukawa Station, Tōhoku Main Line, Fukushima, Fukushima Prefecture
Rikuchū-Matsukawa Station, Ōfunato Line, Ichinoseki, Iwate Prefecture
Shinano-Matsukawa Station, Ōito Line, Kitaazumi District, Nagano Prefecture

People with the surname
Nami Matsukawa (born 1961), Japanese actress
Naruki Matsukawa (born 1991), Japanese actor
Tomoaki Matsukawa (born 1973), Japanese football player

Other uses
 Matsukawa derailment, a 1949 train derailment near Matsukawa Station, Fukushima

Japanese-language surnames